Songs from the Archives is Crimson Moonlight's first compilation album.

Tracks 1–5 are taken from the Eternal Emperor EP, tracks 15–18 are taken from a 2001 demo, and tracks 19–20 are taken from The Covenant Progress. The version of "A Thorn in My Heart" that appears on this album is an older version that was rearranged for release on The Covenant Progress.

Track listing
"Preludium" - 01:58 
"Where Darkness Cannot Reach" - 03:29 
"Symphony of Moonlight - 02:19 
"Eternal Emperor - 04:29
"The Final Battle - 05:41] 
"Glorification of the Master of Light - 02:54 (live)
"From Death to Life - 03:37 (live)
"Alone in Silence - 01:51 (live) 
"Skymingsljus (Light of Twilight)" - 04:10 (live)
"Ljuset (The Light) - 04:14 (live) 
"Eternal Emperor" - 03:57 (live)
"Postludium - 02:03 (live)
"Fullmånen Skola Vändas Uti Blod (The Full Moon Will Turn Into Blood)" - 00:38 (live)
"Blood Covered My Needs" - 03:38  
"Your Face" - 07:31  
"Touch of Emptiness" - 01:38  
"...And Thus Rejoice" - 06:34  
"A Thorn in My Heart" - 05:34
"The Pilgrimage" - 04:13
"A Painting in Dark" - 04:51

Crimson Moonlight albums
2003 compilation albums